Estonia competed at the 1992 Winter Olympics in Albertville, France.
It was the first time since 1936 that the nation had competed as an independent nation at the Winter Olympic Games.  Estonian athletes competed for the Soviet Union from 1956 to 1988. Estonian National Olympic Representative was Tiit Nuudi and Estonian Olympic Team attaché was Ene Balder.

Competitors
The following is the list of number of competitors in the Games.

Estonia also had a competitor at the demonstration event speed skiing (Aare Tamme).

Biathlon

Men

Women

Cross-country skiing

Men

Women

Figure skating

Nordic combined

References

sports-reference - Estonia at the 1992 Winter Olympics
Official Olympic Reports

External links
 EOK – Albertville 1992 

Nations at the 1992 Winter Olympics
1992
1992 in Estonian sport